Höchst im Odenwald (officially Höchst i. Odw.) is a municipality in the Odenwaldkreis (district) in Hesse, Germany.

Geography

Location
Höchst lies 25 km east of Darmstadt, in the northern Odenwald at elevations between 175 and 400 m.

Neighbouring communities
Höchst borders in the north on the town of Groß-Umstadt (Darmstadt-Dieburg) and the town of Breuberg, in the east on the community of Lützelbach, in the south on the town of Bad König, in the southwest on the community of Brensbach and in the west on the community of Otzberg (Darmstadt-Dieburg).

Constituent communities
Höchst's Ortsteile, besides the main centre, also called Höchst, are Annelsbach, Dusenbach, Forstel, Hassenroth i.Odw., Hetschbach, Hummetroth, Mümling-Grumbach and Pfirschbach.

History

The Höchster Becken ("Höchst Basin"), was permanently settled, as were other favourable locations, no later than the New Stone Age. Many Stone Age remnants as well as finds from Celtic and Roman times bear witness to this. In the outlying centre of Hummetroth, a Roman villa rustica from the 2nd century was unearthed and may be visited as an open-air museum. It is known as the Römische Villa Haselburg.

Höchst had its first documentary mention in 1156. Its overlords in the Middle Ages were, among others, the Lords of Breuberg, the Counts of Wertheim, the Lords of Eppstein and the Counts of Erbach. By the time that the Thirty Years' War was over, the community had nearly died out, recovering only very slowly.

Through municipal restructuring in Hesse, the community of Annelsbach, which up to this time had been self-governing, was amalgamated in 1969. Following in 1971 were Forstel, Hummetroth, Pfirschbach, Hassenroth, Mümling-Grumbach, Hetschbach and Dusenbach. Since 1857, the valley of the Obrunnbach has been known as the Obrunnschlucht ("Obrunn Gorge") and has undergone changes due to tourism.

Politics

The municipal election held on 27 March 2011 yielded the following results:

Elections in March 2016:
CDU: 7 seats
SPD: 10 seats
GRÜNE: 3 seats
FDP: 1 seats
KAH: 7 seats
WfH: 3 seats
Total: 31 seats
Voter turnout 49,7 %

Mayor
At the mayoral election on 5 February 2006, Reiner Guth (KAH) was elected mayor with 64.3% of the vote. His opponent Jürgen Hild (SPD) got 35.7%. 
On 31 August 2011 Rainer Guth retired from his office due to health reasons. He died on 11 October 2011.
He was succeeded by the non-party member Horst Bitsch in a run-off election on 20 November 2011, who took office on 2 January 2012. He was re-elected in 2017.

Town partnerships
The community of Höchst im Odenwald maintains partnership arrangements with the following places:
 Montmélian, Savoie, France since 1966
 Bělotín, Olomouc Region, Czech Republic

Economy and infrastructure

Transport

Höchst, like Hetschbach and Mümling-Grumbach, is connected by the Odenwald Railway (Odenwaldbahn; RMV Line 65) towards the north with Hanau and, through a change of trains, to Frankfurt am Main, towards the northwest directly with Darmstadt and towards the south with Erbach and Eberbach in the Neckar valley.

Owing to the rising traffic volume on Bundesstraße 45, which runs north-south through the middle of Höchst, a bypass has been built to the west of the community to reduce through traffic on the roadway through downtown, which along some stretches is rather narrow. The first spadeful of earth was turned on 27 July 2005. The 2.8 km-long bypass has finally opened in December 2009. The building cost has been assessed at €22,800,000.

Education
Since 1964, Höchst has been home to the Ernst-Göbel-Schule, a cooperative comprehensive school with a Gymnasium upper level.

Regular events
Each year in May, the four-day Apple Blossom Festival (Apfelblütenfest) takes place. On this occasion, an "Apple Blossom Queen" (Apfelblütenkönigin) is chosen. In 2007, the festival was held for the 56th time.
Another tradition is the Odenwälder Kartoffelmarkt (potato market).
Yearly, in November, the theatrical group TEGS stages a première of a play at the community centre.

Personalities

Honorary citizen 
 Franz Polak (1909–2000), Roman Catholic clergyman

Sons and daughters of the community 
 Karl Scherer (1862–1931), Member of the Parliament
 Rose Nabinger (1958), jazz singer, text writer

References

External links

 
 Community’s official site 
 Annelsbach 
 Mümling-Grumbach 

Odenwaldkreis